David Poltorak was a Sale of the Century grand champion in Australia in 1986. In his eight episodes, he won a grand total of A$376,200, including $244,000 in cash and $132,200 in prizes. At the time, this total was a world record for winnings on a television game show.

Poltorak holds three records for Australian Sale:
 Highest number of questions answered correctly in one episode: 35 out of 55.
 Highest winning score: $200.
 Most number of questions answered correctly in 60 second fast money: 16.
(All of these records were achieved on Poltorak's last night as champ on episode number 1443.)

In 1991, Poltorak replaced Fran Powell as question writer/adjudicator for Sale and held the position until the show's end in 2001. He then became a question writer for Australian Who Wants to Be a Millionaire?, and is now a question writer for Millionaire Hot Seat.

References
 

Australian television personalities
Contestants on Australian game shows
Living people
Year of birth missing (living people)